Whampoa is the western terminus of the  of the MTR in Hong Kong. It is located in Hung Hom, Kowloon City District within the developed area of Whampoa Garden immediately adjacent to the stern of The Whampoa, a symbol of identity for the area and its history.

The station was named after Whampoa Garden, which was built on the former site of Whampoa Dockyard.

History
Whampoa station was constructed under the HK$856 million Kwun Tong Line Extension Contract 1002, which was awarded in 2011 to a joint venture comprising Hong Kong contractors Chun Wo and Hip Hing Construction. This contract covered both the station as well as the overrun tunnel beyond it. The two station concourses were constructed using the cut-and-cover method, while the platform tunnel in between was built using the "drill-and-split" method. The use of tunnel boring machines was not preferred due to the lack of staging space in the densely built-up area, while drill-and-blast was not used at Whampoa Station in response to local concerns regarding safety and noise.

The station was originally due to be open in 2015, but due to delays during the construction of the underground portion of the station, it opened on 23 October 2016.

Station layout 

The station consists of a platform tunnel between two separate concourses and is mainly underground except for the entrances and ventilation shafts. The western concourse is located at the junction of Hung Hom Road and Tak Man Street while the eastern concourse is located along Tak On Street and is crossed by Shung King and Tak Ting Streets.

Due to the fact that the single track at Whampoa cannot accommodate all Kwun Tong line trains during Monday to Friday peak hours (07:00 to 09:30, 16:30 to 19:00), Saturdays (07:15 to 20:00) as well as Sundays and public holidays (08:40 to 20:00), half of Kwun Tong line trains terminate at the preceding Ho Man Tin station. As a result, trains serve Whampoa at four-minute intervals, twice as long as the other stations.

Exits
A: Man Siu Street, Hung Hom
B: Hung Hom Road, Tak Man street, Royal Peninsula, Harbour Place
C1/C2: Shung King Street, Whampoa Garden, Stars by the Harbour
D1/D2: Tak On Street, Laguna Verde, The Harbourfront Landmark

Connections
The station is adjacent to the Whampoa Garden Bus Terminus. It is also a short walk away from the Hung Hom Ferry Pier.

Gallery

References

External links

Legislative Council - MTR Kwun Tong Line extension plan

Hung Hom
Kwun Tong line
MTR stations in Kowloon
Railway stations in Hong Kong opened in 2016